Reynold Jacob (died 1424), of Dorchester, Dorset, was an English politician and cloth trader.

He married a woman named Joan, and had one illegitimate son.

He was a Member (MP) of the Parliament of England for Dorchester in 1417 and 1422.

References

Year of birth missing
1424 deaths
English MPs 1417
Members of the Parliament of England for Dorchester
English MPs 1422